The 25th Infantry Brigade was a war-formed infantry brigade of the British Army that saw active service during both the First and the Second World Wars.

The 25th Brigade was formed in October 1914 just after the outbreak of the First World War with battalions withdrawn from overseas garrisons.  It formed part of the 8th Division and served with it on the Western Front until the end of the war, in particular taking part in the Battle of Neuve Chapelle, the Battle of the Somme and the Battle of Passchendaele.  It was disbanded in March 1919.

The brigade was reformed in November 1939 just after the outbreak of the Second World War.  It saw action during the battles of France and Belgium in May 1940, predominantly with the 50th (Northumbrian) Infantry Division.  After being evacuated at Dunkirk, it remained in the United Kingdom with the 47th (London) Infantry Division until it was disbanded at the end of August 1944.

First World War
The 25th Brigade came into existence on 5 October 1914 (first commanding officer appointed) as part of the 8th Division shortly after the outbreak of the First World War.  It was formed with four regular infantry battalions brought back to the United Kingdom from various overseas garrisons: 2nd Lincolnshire Regiment from Bermuda, 2nd Royal Berkshire Regiment from Jhansi, India, 1st Royal Irish Rifles from Aden, and 2nd Rifle Brigade from Kuldana, Murree, India.  The brigade concentrated at Hursley Park near Winchester and on 5 and 6 November 1914 it landed at Le Havre.  It remained on the Western Front with the 8th Division for the rest of the war.

The brigade saw action at the battles of Neuve-Chapelle (Moated Grange Attack, 18 December 1914), Neuve Chapelle again (10–13 March 1915), Aubers Ridge (9 May 1915), when the brigade commander, Brigadier-General Lowry Cole was killed, and Bois-Grenier (25 September 1915), a diversionary attack for the Battle of Loos.

In early 1916, the brigade gained a trench mortar battery and a machine gun company.  It then fought on the Somme, notably the Battle of Albert on the first day and the attack on Le Transloy on 23–30 October 1916.

In 1917, the brigade took part in operations to follow the Germans in their retreat to the Hindenburg Line (14 March–5 April).  It then took part in the Third Battle of Ypres, notable the Battle of Pilckem Ridge  (31 July–1 August), the Attack on Westhoek (31 July) where the brigade commander, Brigadier-General Coffin, won the Victoria Cross, and the Battle of Langemarck (16–18 August).

The brigade's machine gun company was moved to the divisional 8th Battalion, Machine Gun Corps on 20 January 1918.  In addition, British divisions on the Western Front were reduced from a 12-battalion to a 9-battalion basis in February 1918 and the brigade from four to three battalions.  Thereafter, the brigade commanded three infantry battalions and a trench mortar battery.  1918 saw the return of the war of movement.  It had to withstand the German spring offensive in the First Battles of the SommeBattle of St Quentin (23 March), Actions at the Somme Crossings (24 and 25 March), Battle of Rosieres (26 and 27 March), and Action of Villers-Bretonneux (24 and 25 April)and the Third Battle of the Aisne (27 May–6 June).  It then switched over to counter-attack in the Second Battle of Arras (Battle of the Scarpe, 26–30 August) and the Final Advance in Artois in which the 8th Division captured Douai (17 October).

By the time of the armistice of 11 November 1918, the brigade was Pommeroeul (fr), west of Mons.  On 16 November it moved back to Tournai and by 18 December had completed a move to the Ath–Enghien area.  Here the division commenced demobilization, a process that was completed on 20 March 1919.

Order of battle
The brigade commanded the following units during the war:
 2nd Battalion, Lincolnshire Regimentleft on 3 February 1918 for 62nd Brigade, 21st Division
 2nd Battalion, Princess Charlotte of Wales's (Royal Berkshire Regiment)
 1st Battalion, Royal Irish Riflesleft on 3 February 1918 for 107th Brigade, 36th (Ulster) Division
 2nd Battalion, Rifle Brigade (Prince Consort's Own)
 1/13th (County of London) Battalion, London Regiment (Kensington)joined from England on 13 November 1914; to GHQ Troops on 20 May 1915
 1/1st (City of London) Battalion, London Regimentjoined from England on 14 May 1915; left on 8 February 1916 for 167th (1st London) Brigade, 56th (1st London) Division
 1/8th Battalion, Duke of Cambridge's Own (Middlesex Regiment)joined on 27 August 1915 from 23rd Brigade, 8th Division; left on 23 October 1915 for 70th Brigade, 8th Division
 25th Machine Gun Companyformed 19 January 1916; formed part of 8th Battalion, Machine Gun Corps from 20 January 1918
 25th Trench Mortar Batteryformed in February 1916
 2nd Battalion, East Lancashire Regimentjoined on 3 February 1918 from 24th Brigade, 8th Division

Second World War
The 25th Infantry Brigade was formed in the United Kingdom on 1 November 1939, shortly after the outbreak of the Second World War.  It was formed with three Territorial Army (TA) infantry battalions transferred from existing TA formations: the 4th Buffs (Royal East Kent Regiment) from 133rd Infantry Brigade, 44th (Home Counties) Infantry Division, the 4th Border Regiment from 126th Infantry Brigade, 42nd (East Lancashire) Infantry Division and the 1st/5th Sherwood Foresters from 148th Infantry Brigade, 49th (West Riding) Infantry Division.  Initially under War Office Control, on 18 November it moved to France where it joined the Lines of Communication Troops of the British Expeditionary Force (BEF).

In May 1940, the brigade was variously assigned to a succession of infantry divisions: 5th (4–9 May), 50th (Northumbrian) (9–18 May), 3rd (18–19 May), back to the 50th (19–21 May), 46th (21–26 May) and finally to the 2nd (26–31 May).  The brigade saw action at the Battle of St Omer-La Bassée (23–29 May) before it was evacuated at Dunkirk on 31 May 1940.

On return to the United Kingdom, the brigade joined the 47th (London) Infantry Division.  It remained with the division in the United Kingdom for the rest of its existence, being disbanded on 31 August 1944.

Order of battle
The brigade commanded the following units during the war:
 4th Battalion, Buffs (Royal East Kent Regiment)from 1 November 1939 to 3 May 1940; 2 July to 28 October 1940
 4th (Westmorland) Battalion, Border Regimentfrom 1 November 1939 to 3 May 1940; 2 July 1940 to 5 January 1941
 1/5th Battalion, Sherwood Forestersfrom 1 November 1939 to 3 May 1940
 1/7th Battalion, Queen's Royal Regiment (West Surrey)from 4 May to 28 June 1940
 2nd Battalion, Essex Regimentfrom 4 May 1940 to 29 February 1944
 1st Battalion, Royal Irish Fusiliersfrom 4 May to 26 June 1940
 25th Infantry Brigade Anti-Tank Companyformed 8 July 1940, disbanded 28 November 1941
 9th Battalion, King's Own Royal Regiment (Lancaster)from 27 November 1940 to 1 December 1942
 12th Battalion, South Staffordshire Regimentfrom 11 December 1940 to 14 November 1941
 19th Battalion, Royal Fusiliersfrom 2 January to 24 September 1942
 20th Battalion, Royal Fusiliersfrom 2 January to 10 September 1942
 30th Battalion, King's Own Yorkshire Light Infantryfrom 10 to 26 September 1942
 11th Battalion, York and Lancaster Regimentfrom 24 September to 16 December 1942
 6th Battalion, King's Own Yorkshire Light Infantryfrom 27 September to 13 December 1942
 1st Battalion, Duke of Cornwall's Light Infantryfrom 13 December 1942 to 16 July 1944
 9th Battalion, Royal Norfolk Regimentfrom 16 December 1942 to 14 August 1944
 7th Battalion, North Staffordshire Regimentfrom 5 March to 16 July 1944

Commanders
The 25th Brigade had the following commanders during the First World War:

The 25th Infantry Brigade had the following commanders during the Second World War:

See also

 British infantry brigades of the First World War
 British brigades of the Second World War

Notes

References

Bibliography

External links
 
 
 

Infantry brigades of the British Army in World War I
Infantry brigades of the British Army in World War II
Military units and formations established in 1914
Military units and formations disestablished in 1919
Military units and formations established in 1939
Military units and formations disestablished in 1944